The Hope Dionysus is a statue of Dionysus, the god of wine, wearing a panther skin and casually stretching his left arm over a smaller figure of a woman, in a Neo Attic or archaic pose.

This statue, 82 in. (2.1 m) high, dates to between 27 BC and 68 AD.  It was once owned by the 18th-century British antiquities collector Thomas Hope (hence the name), and later belonged to a descendant of Benjamin Franklin, before being acquired by the Metropolitan Museum of Art in 1990.

Further reading

External links
The Metropolitan Museum of Art Guide, a collection catalog from The Metropolitan Museum of Art containing information on Hope Dionysus (page 308)

Neo-Attic sculptures
Sculptures of Dionysus
Sculptures of the Metropolitan Museum of Art